The Liga 3, most often spelled as Liga III, is the third level of the Romanian football league system. Its name was changed from Divizia C to Liga III before the start of the 2006–07 season. It was the first in this format (six series of 18 teams each).

Current format
Since the 2014–2015 season Liga III was reorganized from 6 to 5 parallel regional divisions, each with 16 teams.

Relegation
The bottom four teams from each division are relegated at the end of the season to the Liga IV. From the 12th placed teams, the team with the least points is relegated. To determine these teams, separate standings are computed, using only the games played against clubs ranked 1st through 11th.

Promotion

Since the 2006–2007 season, the winners of each division got promoted to the 2007–08 Liga II season. There were also two playoff tournaments held at neutral venues involving the second placed teams, one with those from series 1, 2 and 3, the other with those from series 4, 5, and 6. The winners of the playoffs also got promoted to the 2007–08 Liga II season.

Since the 2014–2015 season, the winner of each series promotes directly to the Liga II, in total 5 teams.

List of champions and promoted teams
Source:

Divizia C (–1992 )

Divizia B (1992–1997 )

Divizia C (1997–2006 )

Liga III (2006–2022)

See also
Liga I
Liga II
Liga IV

References

Summary Liga III Romania, us.soccerway.com

 
3
Rom
Professional sports leagues in Romania